The 2015–16 Colorado State Rams women's basketball team represents Colorado State University in the 2015–16 college basketball season. The Rams, led by fourth year head coach Ryun Williams. The Rams played their home games at Moby Arena and were members of the Mountain West Conference. They finish the season 31–2, 18–0 in Mountain West play to win the regular season championship. They also won the Mountain West women's tournament and earn an automatic trip to the NCAA women's tournament where they lost to South Florida in the first round.

Roster

Schedule

|-
!colspan=9 style="background:#00674E; color:#FFC44F;"| Exhibition

|-
!colspan=9 style="background:#00674E; color:#FFC44F;"| Non-conference regular season

|-
!colspan=9 style="background:#00674E; color:#FFC44F;"| Mountain West regular season

|-
!colspan=9 style="background:#00674E;"| Mountain West Women's Tournament

|-
!colspan=9 style="background:#00674E;"| NCAA Women's Tournament

Rankings
2015–16 NCAA Division I women's basketball rankings

See also
2015–16 Colorado State Rams men's basketball team

References

Colorado State
Colorado State Rams women's basketball seasons
Colorado State
Colorado State Rams
Colorado State Rams